Thomas Karp (born October 13, 1946) is an American former professional tennis player.

Biography
Karp played tennis for University High School. Stan Smith beat him in the Ojai Valley Tennis Tournament 1964 Boys’ High School final.

Karp, a top-10 nationally ranked junior from Los Angeles, represented the U.S. Junior Davis Cup team and during the late 1960s played for the UCLA Bruins in varsity tennis. He earned All-American honors for the Bruins in 1968, during which year he was co-captain of the team. His professional career included an appearance in the singles main draw of the 1973 Wimbledon Championships.

At the 1969 Maccabiah Games in Israel, he and partner Peter Fishbach were defeated by American Davis Cup player Allen Fox and Ronald Goldman in the semifinals.

References

External links
 
 

1946 births
Living people
American male tennis players
Jewish American sportspeople
Jewish tennis players
Maccabiah Games competitors for the United States
Competitors at the 1969 Maccabiah Games
Maccabiah Games tennis players
UCLA Bruins men's tennis players
Tennis players from Los Angeles